Geoffrey O'Halloran Giles (27 June 1923 – 18 December 1990) was an Australian politician.

Giles was born in Adelaide, South Australia, a son of Hew O'Halloran Giles, and Nellie Cosford Giles (née Verco), eldest daughter of Dr. W. A. Verco. They lived at Thorngate, then "Willyama", Medindie, and he was educated in Victoria at Geelong Grammar School before returning to South Australia to attend the University of Adelaide and Roseworthy College. He became a grazier and cattle breeder, and served in the Royal Australian Air Force from 1942 to 1945 during the Second World War.

In 1959, Giles was elected to a Southern district seat in the Legislative Council as a Liberal and Country League member. In 1964, he resigned to contest the by-election for the Australian House of Representatives seat of Angas, caused by the resignation of Alec Downer; he won the seat as a candidate for the LCL's federal counterpart, the Liberal Party. He held Angas until its abolition in 1977. He then followed most of his constituents into neighboring Wakefield, defeating fellow Liberal Bert Kelly for preselection. Giles served as the member for Wakefield until his retirement in 1983.

Giles died in 1990, aged 67.

References

Liberal and Country League politicians
Liberal Party of Australia members of the Parliament of Australia
Members of the South Australian Legislative Council
Members of the Australian House of Representatives for Angas
Members of the Australian House of Representatives for Wakefield
Members of the Australian House of Representatives
1923 births
1990 deaths
20th-century Australian politicians
People educated at Geelong Grammar School
Royal Australian Air Force personnel of World War II
Royal Australian Air Force officers